Glafenine is a nonsteroidal anti-inflammatory drug (NSAID).  Use of glafenine is limited due to the risk of anaphylaxis and acute kidney failure.

See also 
 Floctafenine, a chemically related NSAID

References 

Analgesics
Vicinal diols
Quinolines
Hepatotoxins
Anthranilates
Nonsteroidal anti-inflammatory drugs
Chloroarenes